Dalgan may refer to:
 Dalgan County, an administrative subdivision of Iran
 Delegan (disambiguation)
 Dezocine, trade name Dalgan, a pharmaceutical